The puna tinamou (Tinamotis pentlandii) also known as Pentland's tinamou, is a member of the most ancient groups of bird families, the tinamous. This species is native to southern South America. The binomial name of the species commemorates the Irish natural scientist Joseph Barclay Pentland (1797–1873) by Nicholas Aylward Vigors in 1837.

Taxonomy
This is a monotypic species. All tinamou are from the family Tinamidae, and in the larger scheme are also ratites. Unlike other ratites, tinamous can fly, although in general, they are not strong fliers. All ratites evolved from prehistoric flying birds, and tinamous are the closest living relative of these birds.

Description
Its upper parts are brown spotted with white, and its breast is blue-grey, and its belly is rufous. Its head is white with black streaks.

Distribution and habitat
The puna tinamou inhabits high-altitude grassland, and to a lesser extent, brushland at altitude  of subtropical and tropical regions. Its range is Peru, northern Bolivia, northern Chile and northwestern Argentina.

Footnotes

References

External links 
 BirdLife Species Factsheet
 Puna Tinamou videos on the Internet Bird Collection
 Stamps (for Argentina, Bolivia) with RangeMap
 Photo-High Res--(Puna Tinamou and chicks)

puna tinamou
Birds of the Puna grassland
puna tinamou